David Joseph Weeks (born 1944) is an American neuropsychologist, educator and author best known for his study of eccentricity.  Born and raised in Garwood, New Jersey, Weeks moved to Scotland in 1975. He practices at the Royal Edinburgh Hospital.  Weeks is the author of two popular books on the study of eccentrism, Eccentrics: The Scientific Investigation (1988) and Eccentrics: A Study of Sanity and Strangeness (1995).

References

Further reading
Darnton John (September 12, 1997). "Zanies? Here they’re eccentrics and proud of it". New York Times. 
Gluck Jeremy (1995). "The way we ought to be". New Scientist. 145(1966):37. 
Kenny, Michael G. (1997). "Eccentrics: A Study of Sanity and Strangeness". Canadian Review of Sociology & Anthropology. 34(2):242. 
Therivel, William A. (1996). "Are Eccentrics Creative? On Weeks and James's Eccentrics". Creativity Research Journal. 2/3:289. 
Tucker, S. D. (2015). Great British Eccentrics. Amberley Publishing Limited. 

Living people
1944 births
People from Garwood, New Jersey
21st-century American psychologists
20th-century American psychologists